The 2015 Mid-Eastern Athletic Conference baseball tournament began on May 13 and ended on May 16 at Arthur W. Perdue Stadium in Salisbury, MD.  It was a six-team double elimination tournament.  Florida A&M won their first tournament championship and claimed the Mid-Eastern Athletic Conference's automatic bid to the 2015 NCAA Division I baseball tournament.  Runner-up Bethune-Cookman had claimed fourteen of the sixteen tournament championships, with Savannah State winning in 2013 and North Carolina A&T earning the 2005 title.

Format and seeding
The top three teams in the North Division and top three finishers from the South Division were seeded one through three based on regular season divisional records, with first round matchups of the second seed from the North and the third seed from the South, the second seed from the South against the third seed from the North, with the divisional winners gaining first round byes.  The first round winners advance in the winners' bracket to face regular season divisional champions in the second round, while first round losers play elimination games.  The format means that one team from the North and two from the South will be left out of the field.

Savannah State earned the tiebreaker for the S3 seed over North Carolina Central.

Results

References

Tournament
Mid-Eastern Athletic Conference Baseball Tournament
Mid-Eastern Athletic Conference baseball tournament
Mid-Eastern Athletic Conference Baseball